Gregory K. Beale (born 1949 in Dallas, Texas; also known as G. K. Beale) is a biblical scholar, currently a Professor of New Testament and Biblical Theology at Reformed Theological Seminary in Dallas, Texas. He is an ordained minister in the Orthodox Presbyterian Church.  He has made a number of contributions to conservative biblical hermeneutics, particularly in the area of the use of the Old Testament in the New Testament and is one of the most influential and prolific active New Testament scholars in the world. He served as the president of the Evangelical Theological Society in 2004.  In 2013, he was elected by Westminster Theological Seminary to be the first occupant of the J. Gresham Machen Chair of New Testament. At his inauguration he delivered an address titled The Cognitive Peripheral Vision of Biblical Writers.

Education
 Ph.D, University of Cambridge, 1981
 Th.M, Dallas Theological Seminary, 1976
 MA, Southern Methodist University, 1976
 BA, Southern Methodist University, 1971

Positions held
Grove City College (1980–1984)
Gordon-Conwell Theological Seminary (1984–2000)
Wheaton College (2000–2010)
Westminster Theological Seminary (2010-2021)
Reformed Theological Seminary (2021-present)

Works

Thesis

Books
 – published revision of Beale's 1980 Cambridge Ph.D. dissertation

 

 
 - a précis of the 1998 work The Book of Revelation

Chapters

Journal articles

Festschrift

References

1949 births
Living people
People from Dallas
Presbyterians from Texas
Orthodox Presbyterian Church ministers
American Calvinist and Reformed theologians
American male non-fiction writers
American biblical scholars
American evangelicals
Calvinist and Reformed biblical scholars
Hermeneutists
New Testament scholars
Old Testament scholars
20th-century Calvinist and Reformed theologians
20th-century Christian biblical scholars
21st-century Calvinist and Reformed theologians
21st-century Christian biblical scholars
Alumni of the University of Cambridge
Dallas Theological Seminary alumni
Gordon–Conwell Theological Seminary faculty
Westminster Theological Seminary faculty
Wheaton College (Illinois) faculty
Grove City College